Topsham may refer to:

United Kingdom 
 Topsham, Devon
 Topsham railway station

United States 
 Topsham, Maine
 Topsham (CDP), Maine
 Topsham, Vermont

See also
 
 Topham (disambiguation)